"Contemporary Chinese Thought and the Question of Modernity" is an influential article of around 35,000 characters in length by Chinese intellectual historian and literary scholar Wang Hui, written in 1994 and published in left-wing literature journal Tianya (天涯) in 1997. An English translation by Rebecca E. Karl appeared in a volume of Social Text titled "Intellectual Politics in Post-Tiananmen China" (1998).

The article became the subject of intense debate and attention both for its methodology—an unusually socio-historical approach to intellectual history—and its expressed politics, which are critical of capitalist modernity. According to academic Yue Gang, it is "a cornerstone in the transformation of contemporary Chinese thought" and "has become a benchmark for the New Left."

See also 
Chinese intellectualism

References

External links
 Wang Hui. "Dangdai Zhongguo de Sixiang Zhuangkuang yu Xiandaixing Wenti" ["Contemporary Chinese Thought and the Question of Modernity"]. Tianya 5 (1997).
 Wang Hui, tr. Rebecca E. Karl. "Contemporary Chinese Thought and the Question of Modernity." Social Text 55: Intellectual Politics in Post-Tiananmen China (1998): pp. 9–44.

Chinese New Left
Magazine articles
1994 documents
Works originally published in Chinese magazines
Modernity